Černá Hora is a market town in Blansko District in the South Moravian Region of the Czech Republic. It has about 2,100 inhabitants.

Etymology
The name of the place (literally "Black Mountain") comes from a hill whose coniferous vegetation looked darker than the surrounding deciduous vegetation. In Latin texts the place is called Nigromons or Czernahora, in German texts Czernahora.

Geography
It lies mostly in the Drahany Highlands, the northern part of extends into the Boskovice Furrow. The Býkovka Stream flows through the northern part of the town.

History
The first written mention of Černá Hora is from 1279, when the Černá Hora Castle was mentioned. It was located on crossroads of two trade routes. In 1390, it was first referred to as a market town. From 1333 to 1597, it was owned by the Černohorský of Boskovice noble family. In 1597, the manor was acquired by marriage by the Liechtenstein family. In 1859, the castle was bought by the House of Fries. In 1945, the castle was confiscated by the state.

Demographics

Sights
The Černá Hora Castle is the main sight. The original Gothic castle was renaissance rebuilt in 1561. After it was destroyed by a fire in 1724, part of it was baroque rebuilt in 1830. After 1859, it was completely rebuilt in the pseudo-Renaissance style by the architect Theophil Hansen. In the same time, the castle park with alleys and exotic trees was founded. Since 1950, it houses a retirement home.

Notable people
Leopold Löw (1811–1875), Hungarian rabbi

References

External links

Market towns in the Czech Republic
Populated places in Blansko District
Shtetls